HMS Spitfire was an  destroyer of the Royal Navy. Spitfire took part in the battle of Jutland in 1916.

Construction
She was launched on 23 December 1912 from the Wallsend yard of Swan, Hunter & Wigham Richardson and joined the Fourth Destroyer Flotilla.

Service during First World War
From the beginning of the First World War, Spitfire and her flotilla were attached to the Grand Fleet.

Battle of Jutland
Amongst the small engagements which happened during the night of 31 May–1 June 1916 during the Battle of Jutland was one between Spitfire and the German battleship . Spitfire evaded an attempt by Nassau to ram her, but the two ships nevertheless collided and Spitfire was seriously damaged, blast from Nassaus guns demolishing much of her upperworks, but she ripped off a  section of the German ship's side plating. Both ships survived to return to port.

Assistance to the hospital ship Rhodesia
Spitfire helped in the rescue of survivors from the hospital/evacuation ship Rhodesia (formerly the Union Castle liner ) which was torpedoed 160 miles off Fastnet by the German submarine  on 12 September 1918.

Disposal
Spitfire was sold to Thos. W. Ward shipbreakers for scrapping on 9 May 1921.

Pennant numbers

References

External links 

 Battle of Jutland Crew Lists Project - HMS Spitfire Crew List

 

Acasta-class destroyers
World War I destroyers of the United Kingdom
Ships built on the River Tyne
1912 ships